Belgium has participated in the Eurovision Young Dancers 11 times since its debut in 1985. In 1987, Belgium and the Netherlands participated together with a joint entry.

Participation overview

See also
Belgium in the Eurovision Song Contest
Belgium in the Eurovision Young Musicians
Belgium in the Junior Eurovision Song Contest

External links 
 Eurovision Young Dancers

Countries in the Eurovision Young Dancers